Paulo Sérgio Pinheiro (born 8 January 1944)
is a Brazilian legal scholar with relevant work within the United Nations System.

Career
Pinheiro was born in Rio de Janeiro. He has a long career in academia, having held academic positions at the University of São Paulo, among others.

Within the United Nations System, he served as the Special Rapporteur on the situation of human rights in Myanmar. He also served as United Nations Special Rapporteur for Burundi from 1995 to 1999,
and was a member of the Sub-Commission on the Promotion and Protection of Human Rights. 
In 2003, Secretary-General Kofi Annan appointed Pinheiro as an independent expert, with the rank of Assistant Secretary-General, to prepare an in-depth study into the global phenomenon of violence against children, 
which was presented to the General Assembly in 2006.

Pinheiro served as one of the seven commissioners of the Organization of American States's Inter-American Commission on Human Rights for the 2004-2011 period, with special responsibility for the rights of children 
Domestically, he served as federal Secretary of State for Human Rights under President Fernando Henrique Cardoso.

In 2011, Pinheiro was appointed chair of the International Commission of Inquiry for Syria.

References

1944 births
Living people
United Nations special rapporteurs
Members of the Sub-Commission on the Promotion and Protection of Human Rights
Commanders of the National Order of Scientific Merit (Brazil)
Brazilian people of Portuguese descent
Brazilian officials of the United Nations